Aris Basketball Club (transliterated into English Aris B.S.A.) known in European competitions as Aris Thessaloniki, is the professional basketball team of the major Thessaloniki-based Greek multi-sport club A.C. Aris Thessaloniki. Aris BC was founded in 1922, eight years after the founding of the multi-sport club and the football team. Their traditional home arena is Alexandreio Melathron (Nick Galis Hall).

Aris B.C. is one of the most successful Greek basketball clubs of all time, tallying ten Greek League championships and eight Greek Cups, making the Double four times (1986–87, 1987–88, 1988–89, 1989–90). They have also won three European titles: the FIBA European Cup (1992–93), the FIBA Korać Cup (1996–97) and the FIBA Europe Champions Cup (2002–03). They are also one of only two non-relegated teams from the Greek League, with participation in every Greek First Division Championship until today (the other team is Panathinaikos). Aris holds the record for the most straight wins in the Greek League, at an amazing 80 consecutive wins in a row. Before the arrival of Nikos Galis to Aris, and the first European successes of the team, Greek basketball wasn't as competitive as it was in other European countries. Consequently, Aris helped to establish basketball in Greece, and to greatly increase its popularity across the country.

Under the leadership of the legendary duo of Nikos Galis and Panagiotis Giannakis, Aris was the dominant force in Greek basketball during the 1980s and early 1990s. It is for this period of dominance that Aris BC has been nicknamed "The Emperor", and was voted the most successful Greek sporting club of the 20th century. Aris is also one of the most renowned Greek clubs in European basketball, participating in three consecutive FIBA European Champions Cup Final Fours, and later on winning three lower-tier level European titles. The historic win of the FIBA Korać Cup in the 1996–97 season in particular, bolstered the notion that Aris has a unique place in the history of Greek basketball, and in the history of Greek sports in general.

Well-known notable players that have played with the club over the years, among others, include: Nikos Galis, Panagiotis Giannakis, Nikos Filippou, Lefteris Subotić, Miroslav Pecarski, Stojko Vranković, Mike Jones, Walter Berry, Edgar Jones, Roy Tarpley, Reggie Theus, Panagiotis Liadelis, Harold Ellis, José "Piculín" Ortiz, Mario Boni, Žarko Paspalj, Martin Müürsepp, Tiit Sokk, Mikhail Mikhailov, Joe Arlauckas, Giorgos Sigalas, Andrew Betts, Nikos Chatzivrettas, Nestoras Kommatos, Will Solomon, Michalis Kakiouzis, Dimos Dikoudis, Mahmoud Abdul-Rauf, Jeremiah Massey, Kostas Papanikolaou, Kostas Sloukas and Bryant Dunston.

History

Early history

Aris B.C., the basketball branch of Aris Thessaloniki AC, was founded in 1922, 8 years after the founding of Aris AC.  The sport of basketball was still new to Greece then, having been introduced in the country in 1919. In those days, the teams shared a single open-air court, and Aris competed in the local Thessaloniki regional championship, which it won 5 times, in the years 1926–30. During these first steps of the sport, it was significant also the contribution of the Armenian community of the city, with players like Exoutzian, Daneilian, Benlian, Marasian, Kontaxian, Karabetian, Isujian and Jamjian.

The first nationwide Greek Championship was held in 1927–28, and Aris BC won its first Greek championship title on 23 April 1930, after beating ΧΑΝΘ with a score of 32–22. Aris quickly created a remarkable tradition in basketball, with notable figures, like Faidon Matthaiou (considered the Patriarch of Greek basketball) and Anestis Petalidis, who was coach of the team for almost two decades.

The first appearance by Aris in an official international European-wide competition was during the 1966–67 season, when they participated in the 2nd-tier level European Cup Winner's Cup, as the Greek League runners-up. From that season onward, Aris acquired the Alexandreio Melathron as its home court, which it still is to this day.

Legendary years: Galis, Giannakis and Ioannidis era (1978–1993)

1978–79 Greek Champions

The post-World War II Greek League period was marked by the dominance of basketball teams from Athens, but this all began to change in 1979.  In that year, Aris won their first Greek League championship in the modern era, largely through the inspired play of Charis Papageorgiou, and the coaching of Giannis Ioannidis, an ex-player of the team. It helped provide the spark for the complete domination of Greek basketball by Aris, during the second half of the 1980s and the early 1990s.

Nikos Galis arrives (1979)

If that first Greek championship was the spark, then the fuel for Aris' brilliant stint at the top of the sport was undoubtedly Nikos Galis, thought by many Greek basketball fans to be the best Greek basketball player of all time, and one of the best ever in Europe. Galis, the son of Rhodian immigrants from New Jersey, signed on to the team in October 1979, and played his first game against Iraklis in December of that year, scoring 30 points. Fred Develey, the former coach of Maccabi Tel Aviv, who later became coach of Aris, was instrumental in convincing the management that Galis would not only change Greek basketball, but that he would change also Greek basketball in Europe. The management was more concerned about his lack of height than his ability, until they saw him play.

1982–83 Greek Champions
It would take another four years for Aris to rise to the top of the Greek League again, winning the national championship in 1983, with Galis taking the game in Greece to new heights, showing coordination and creativity that was then (some would argue even now) unprecedented in Greek courts, and almost beating powerhouse rivals like Olympiacos and Panathinaikos single-handed. That year also marked the return of Giannis Ioannidis to the Aris bench as coach.

A very successful 1983–1984 season had a bitter ending, as Aris battled for both the Greek League championship and the Greek Cup, but lost the national cup final to crosstown rivals PAOK, and the league championship game to Panathinaikos, under dubious circumstances. A taste of things to come, however, had been offered during Aris' games against Maccabi Tel Aviv in the qualifying round for the first-tier level FIBA European Champions Cup (EuroLeague), in the fall of 1983. Aris was narrowly eliminated by the very powerful Israeli League team, but not before posting an away win at Tel Aviv, something that no other European team had managed to do for many years.

The coming of Giannakis and the domination in Greece

1985–1991: 7 consecutive Greek Championships (5 Doubles)

Disappointment did not get much in the way of Aris' progress. With the financial support of Akis Michailides, a successful Greek businessman and President of the team, one of the most crucial transfers ever in the Greek League occurred after the 1983–1984 season, when Aris brought Panagiotis Giannakis to the team from Ionikos Nikaias. Nikos Galis now had a first-class partner. The result was total carnage for other teams. The lethal back court blazed through the Greek League for seven consecutive years, with the help of players such as Nikos Filippou, Michalis Romanidis, Lefteris Subotić, Georgios Doxakis, Vassilis Lipiridis, and others, winning 7 Greek League championships, and 5 Greek Cups (with one Greek Cup being memorably lost to Panathinaikos in 1986, with Galis performing surprisingly poorly in a single-elimination game in Athens). Especially between 1985 and 1988, the question was not who the Greek League champion would be, but if Aris would go undefeated or not, as the club won an unparalleled 80 games in a row at one point.

European distinction

In the 1984–1985 season, came Aris' first significant European success: Aris reached the semifinals of the 3rd-tier level FIBA Korać Cup, eventually losing to Ciaocrem Varese of the Italian League, and without the services of Galis for the first game in Thessaloniki (he was injured in practice 3 days before the game).

Aris formed the backbone of the senior Greece men's national basketball team, sending Galis, Giannakis, Filippou, Romanidis, and Lipiridis (to help Greece win the gold medal at the EuroBasket 1987, and the silver medal at the EuroBasket 1989). The back court combination of Galis-Giannakis first came to European prominence at the 1986 FIBA World Championship in Spain, where upstarts Greece performed surprisingly well, while Galis won the top-scorer of the tournament award.

It was during that year, 1986, that Aris made headlines in Europe in the FIBA European Champions Cup (EuroLeague) qualifying round. Having been unceremoniously eliminated by Limoges CSP of the French League in 1985 (1985–86 season), Aris was arbitrarily paired against Tracer Milano in the qualifying round. An insurmountable task, considering that Tracer were arguably the best team in Europe, and furthermore had acquired Bob McAdoo, possibly the best American player (still) to ever play in Europe. Aris, sporting Nikos Galis, Panagiotis Giannakis, Lefteris Subotić, and a third rate American player, Jackson, managed an unbelievable win in Thessaloniki, by 31 points, almost assuring the elimination of Tracer, and an advancement into the final group of the 6 best European teams. However, the return leg game saw Olimpia win by 34 points, thus eliminating Aris. Galis was absent due to an injury problem.

Aris had to wait for another year to compete in Europe again, but their strength had been established. In 1987, Aris was not paired against an established FIBA European Champions' Cup (now called EuroLeague) team, and thus advanced to the final round of the 8 best European champions. The same was achieved in the next four years, and while Aris did not win the FIBA European Champions' Cup, they were very successful in the tournaments, reaching the Final Four of the tournament in 1988, 1989, and 1990. By then, Aris had become a household name in basketball in Europe.

Favourite team in Greece

The most important contribution of Aris to Greek basketball, was the establishment of the sport in Greece as an almost pure viewing spectacle. Aris (chiefly through the play of Nikos Galis) elevated the measly standards that previously existed among Greek teams, to new heights that demanded the attention of the sports fans. It was a team that mesmerized audiences that were used to boring styles of play, and showed flashes of brilliance night in and night out. The fervent desire to see the team they supported win, quite evident in the Greek people, succumbed to the enjoyment that the fans received from watching a team perform in such an entertaining fashion, even while dismantling their opponents.

Greek League arenas were completely sold out wherever Aris was playing, the opponents' fans were applauding Aris for their performance, and many of the streets in towns and cities were empty when Aris played European games. As Greeks throughout the country were glued to their TV sets, to watch the inspired play of Galis and company. Such was the impact that basketball briefly overtook football as the most popular sport in Greece. For example, Aris was playing basketball with other European teams every Thursday night. From that time, and even up until 2003, every Thursday night, cinemas in Greece offered tickets at reduced prices.

The Aris–PAOK rivalry

A special reference must be made to the rivalry between Aris and PAOK. The two clubs are fierce rivals in all sports, but the Aris and PAOK basketball face-offs had a distinct flavor between 1985 and 1992, as they were the top two basketball teams in Greece at that time. In games where a defeat is more than just a lost game, the mood of most of the fans of either Aris or PAOK, is quite seriously affected, for some time following a defeat to their opponents.

The most memorable game between Aris and PAOK was the third playoff game between the two teams in 1991. Aris had a two-game lead, after winning the first two games of the series, but PAOK managed to even the score with two victories in the first two playoff games, so, naturally, they had the momentum going into the fifth game of the best-of-seven series. PAOK was up by four points, almost 10 seconds before the end of that fifth game. What followed left bad memories for many PAOK fans: Aris' Panagiotis Giannakis scored a quick two-point basket, reducing the deficit to two points. A sloppy in-bounds pass from PAOK was then stolen by Aris' Dinos Angelidis, who then passed the ball to Nikos Galis, who (while being guarded by a frenzied John Korfas) started to penetrate, but then Galis passed the ball to Giannakis, who promptly drilled a three-pointer at the buzzer. Aris went on to win the next playoff game, and thus win the 1991 Greek League championship.

1992–93 FIBA European Cup Winners

In 1992, Aris won the Greek Cup, versus AEK. That Greek Cup Final was quite significant, since it marked Galis' last game with Aris. The player who almost by himself, had made basketball hugely popular in Greece, had won 8 Greek League championships and 6 Greek Cups with Aris, in 13 years.

The team's management made what was proven to be a mistake in their plans for the 1992–93 season. The President (Mitroudis), in cooperation with Steve Giatzoglou (the team's new head coach), decided to build the new team around Giannakis, instead of around Galis. Even though Roy Tarpley was signed by the team, and Aris was dominating at the start of the season, things eventually fell apart. Irresponsible team management, in conjunction with a lack of discipline, led to the team finishing in the 5th spot in the final standings of the Greek League. However, a surprise European-wide success came for the team, as Aris won the European 2nd-tier level FIBA European Cup, after beating Efes Pilsen, by a score of 48–50, in a very dramatic game, in which Aris won their first European-wide title.

Years of crisis and mismanagement (1993–2003) 
With the departure of Michailides from the team's presidency in 1992, a long period of financial mismanagement of the club began, with the result that the club became indebted, and the team declined, especially in the Greek League.

With the exception of advancing to the semifinals of the FIBA European Cup of 1994, those two seasons (1993–94, 1994–95) were marked by players (Panagiotis Giannakis, Vangelis Vourtzoumis, Miroslav Pecarski, Vassilis Lipiridis, and Michail Misunov) filing lawsuits against the team, for not receiving their salaries and bonus incentives. Repeated wrong choices of foreign players, changing of coaches, as well as inept management by the ownership, were the highlights, rather than success on the court. Well-known Terry Catledge fled the team, Sam Vincent and Sean Higgins were released, while other inappropriate player choices, such as Anthony Frederick and Chris King were made. Despite all of this, the usual support of the fans, combined with the rise of some Greek players (Dinos Angelidis and Panagiotis Liadelis) supported Aris, and the team managed to qualify for the Korać Cup of the next year.

1996–97 FIBA Korać Cup Winners
The 1995–96 season can be considered as a messenger of a change in Aris' fate. With Soulis Markopoulos as the team's head coach, Aris played disciplined basketball, with an extra emphasis on defense (perhaps for the first time in Aris' history). Panagiotis Liadelis and Dinos Angelidis, along with the unexpectedly good Harold Ellis, started to draw the crowds back into Alexandreio Melathron. That Aris team beat their arch-rivals PAOK, once during the Greek League regular season, while also advancing to a 4-team group in the European-wide FIBA Korać Cup, where they almost got first place in their group. It was clear that things were on the upswing once again for the club.

In the summer of 1996, something extraordinary happened for Aris. The team's main sponsor, Zafiris Samoladas, spent a huge amount of money, and revitalized the team. José Ortíz, Charles Shackleford, Tzanis Stavrakopoulos, Floros, Mario Boni, Papadatos, and Cholopoulos joined the team, which, all of a sudden, appeared to be very strong and with exceptional depth at every position. The team started well, by beating PAOK and Panathinaikos, but faltered against Olympiacos, both in the Greek League championship, and for the Greek Cup, losing both games in Thessaloniki, and prompting the firing of Markopoulos.

Subotić, one of the team's three key players from the 1987–1992 era, took over as head coach, and produced some satisfactory results, but Aris still displayed a lot of the disadvantages of a newly formed team. Aris, though, had a spectacular run to the Korać Cup title, Beşiktaş of the Turkish League, Beobanka of the Yugoslavian League, Nikas Peristeri of the Greek League, and Benetton Treviso of the Italian League, were all eliminated by Aris during the competition, in dramatic fashion, with the overtime return leg game in Italy reminding many of the old glory days of Aris in Europe.

The FIBA Korać Cup Final was against Tofaş of the Turkish League, and there couldn't be a more satisfying way of winning the Korać Cup. Aris, the heavy favorites, lost in shocking fashion by 11 points in the first game in Thessaloniki. Centuries old passions and nationalistic enmity resurfaced, as the Turks, feeling assured of the Korać Cup win at that stage, were waiting to give the final blow in Bursa. Fortunately for Aris' fans and Greek fans, the difference in talent and coaching showed in the game in Bursa, where Aris dramatically won by 18 points (70–88), in an arena filled with fanatic spectators, who finally broke down and started hurling debris towards the court, when the outcome was evident.

It was a remarkable moment, as Panagiotis Liadelis, Dinos Angelidis, Giannis Sioutis, and the other Greek players, lifted the Korać Cup inside the Turkish arena, and filled millions of Greeks with pride. That was proven to be the high point of the season. Aris returned to the Greek League games, and in idiotic fashion, lost three games against inferior opponents Panionios, Papagou, and Peiraikos.

In the 1997–98 season, which was yet to start, Aris was sort of an enigma. Having retained all but one (Charles Shackleford) of its main players, and having signed Žarko Paspalj, Tiit Sokk, and Nasos Galakteros, the talent was still there, although rebounding problems were sure to appear. The hiring of Efthimis Kioumourtzoglou as head coach was viewed skeptically by many, as he was regarded as an old-fashioned coach who employed aged and predictable tactics for his teams' play. Samoladas had stepped down from the team's sponsor position, and the team still did not have a wealthy sponsor, or a certain source of revenue to pay for the players' high salaries. Qualification for the EuroLeague was critical that season, but not many of Aris' fans believed it was a realistic goal, as Olympiacos, AEK, and Panathinaikos seemed to be way ahead in terms of personnel and financial status. Still, miracles can happen.

A miracle

Miracles can happen, and this sentence was perfectly understood by the Aris club players. Suddenly, José Ortíz left in mid-January 1998, due to the fact that the team didn't have the money to pay him. Tiit Sokk followed him on his way out as well. The leadership of Lefteris Hatzopoulos ended, Efthimis Kioumourtzoglou was no longer the team's head coach, and Aris was in God's hands, while some of the most dramatic moments in the club's history were taking place. The club had no money, but they had plenty of soul. Within two weeks, they beat all of the considered to be big teams of Greece, (Olympiacos, PAOK, Panathinaikos, and AEK), beating the last two in the Final Four of the Greek Cup, and they became winners of the 1997–98 Greek Cup. Mario Boni was about to leave the team too, before the Greek Cup Final Four, but he stayed because he loved the team and its fans, and he helped the team a lot in this tremendous effort. Then he moved on to join Aeroporti di Roma Virtus, as he couldn't stand it anymore either. Brave heart Aris continued with just 8 players thereafter in the season. Nonetheless, the downfall of Aris continued during the next years.

Recent history

2003–14
In 2003, the old Aris BC company was dissolved, due to the large amount of debts that it owed, and a new K.A.E. (basketball club) was created. A group of local businessmen from Thessaloniki, through the "Genesis Association", decided to take the majority stake.

2002–03 season

In October 2002, Aris beat Peristeri, at the eighth-finals of the Greek Cup, and proceeded to the Greek Cup Final Four for the first time since 1999. Aris' fans realized that the best was yet to come, as along with the qualification Aris, was a very competitive team that was among the top teams in Europe's 4th-tier level FIBA EuroCup Challenge. Among others, Aris had in its squad, players such as Will Solomon, Ryan Stack, Fedor Likholitov, Miroslav Raičević, and Ivan Grgat.

However, the first attempt to regain the title of the Greek Cup was unsuccessful. The final four of the competition, held in Larissa, was the great rendezvous for all Aris fans around Greece. There were 3,500 crazy Aris fans in the sold out 5,500 capacity stadium of Larissa Neapolis Arena, and they did their best to support the team, in order to win the first Aris BC title since 1998. In the semifinal, Aris came back from a −24-point deficit, and finally beat Makedonikos by a score of 92–86. Aris proceeded on to the Greek Cup Final against rival Panathinaikos, whose task was much easier, as they had only needed to overcome Irakleio in the other semifinal.

The Greek Cup Final, held the next day, was a very tight and competitive game, but at the end, some critical and partial decisions of the referees in favor of Panathinaikos, as well as the fatigue of Aris' players from the previous day's semifinal, were the decisive factors that gave Panathinaikos the title. However, Aris' fans renewed their rendezvous for the upcoming final four of FIBA Europe Champions Cup, that was going to take place in Alexandreio, at Thessaloniki.

2002–03 FIBA EuroCup Challenge Winners
In front of 6,000 fans, that filled the Alexandreio Melathron stadium, as early as two hours before the starting jump-ball, Aris hosted KK Hemofarm of the Serbian League, for the semifinal game of the competition, on 2 May 2003. Aris was very nervous and needed a sudden wake-up in the second half, to overcome the difficulties of the game, and overcome the Serbian opponents. Aris was back in a European final. After six difficult and unbearable years. Now, there was only one game left to win a championship. The game would be against Prokom Trefl Sopot of the Polish League. Aris' fans were again ready at their positions, and created a unique atmosphere that remained the trademark of the competition. So on 5 May 2003, Aris and Prokom battled for the title. The game was almost the same as the previous one for Aris, and although a second-halftime wake-up call gave the impression that Aris had won the game, Prokom made an unexpected comeback, and was in the lead, 83–81, after a successful three-point shot by Tomas Masiulis, with only six seconds left in the game. At that time, the "ghost" of "the Empire", the one that "led" Aris to its great seven-year reign during the late 1980s, appeared once again in the Alexandreio Melathron. Will Solomon drew a foul for Aris, against Prokom. He made the first free throw, then missed the second free throw, but Miroslav Raičević grabbed the rebound, and put the ball in the basket, and Aris won the game at the very end, by a score of 84–83.

2003–04 season
The beginning of the 2003–04 season found Aris as a nomad inside its own city. Alexandreio Melathron was closed down, in order to get renovated for the 2004 Olympic Games, and Aris was obliged to play its home games in the 2,443 seat Ivanofeio Sports Arena, the home court of Iraklis. The season tickets were sold-out, and available tickets for each game were out of sight at each occasion. The constant packed atmosphere helped to lead Aris to great moments.

Aris was lucky enough that season to have probably its strongest team in a decade, as the club had well-known players that season like: Smush Parker, Toby Bailey, Nestoras Kommatos, Ryan Stack, Fedor Likholitov, and Miroslav Raičević. Aris eliminated Iraklis during the Greek Cup, and proceeded to the Greek Cup Final Four, for the second consecutive season. The Cup's Final Four that year was held at Lamia Indoor Hall Chalkiopoulio, in March.

2,600 Aris fans cheered the team on, as they overcame Apollon Patras in the Cup semifinal game, and proceeded to the final game against rival Olympiacos. During the Cup final game against Olympiacos, some Olympiacos fans acted out with some serious violent behavior, throwing fire rockets into the stands, where the Aris fans were seated and both teams' fans were subsequently forced by the referees to evacuate the arena. Because of the delay caused by this, the game lasted more than 4 hours.

The game continued after the fans were escorted out. Aris' players were able to remain concentrated on the game, and were able to pull out the victory, by a score of 73–70, giving the club its 8th Greek Cup title. The Aris fans that had evacuated the stadium, had remained in their cars to listen to the radio broadcast of the game, and had also gathered at roadside cafes and bars, in order to be able watch the rest of the game on television.

After the victory, the fans rushed out onto the streets, to celebrate, and were soon joined by the team itself in the street celebration, that eventually formed into a celebration convoy that headed back to Thessaloniki. At Thessaloniki, Aris' supporters gathered at the White Tower of Thessaloniki, which is the symbol of the city. The team's players climbed up to the top of the White Tower, to watch the crowd below them and to celebrate with them.

On the other hand, though, that same season, Aris was eliminated in the FIBA EuroCup by fellow Greek League club Maroussi, and its rising star player, Vassilis Spanoulis. Aris lost the best of 3 games series, 2 games to 1, in the final eight round versus Maroussi. That same season, Aris was eliminated in the Greek Basket League playoffs by AEK Athens, who managed to beat Aris at Ivanofeio in the quarterfinals. The Greek League playoff loss to AEK knocked Aris out of a EuroLeague position for the next season.

2004–05 season
In the next season, Aris returned to its home arena, the newly renovated Alexandreio. Aris changed almost its entire squad that year, and added the young and talented player Sofoklis Schortsanitis. In October, Aris drew a bracket match up to play against Makedonikos in the Greek Cup semifinals. That season, there was no Final Four system, and the semifinal match up was a two-game series, rather than a single-elimination game.

Aris had to play its "home" game in the match up at the Larissa Neapolis Arena, instead of at Alexandreio Melathron, as a punishment for what had happened at the previous Greek Cup final game against Olympiacos, where the fans of both clubs had gotten out of control. Aris lost the game in Larissa, the first in the 2 game series, 73–74. The second game was held in Kozani, at Makedonikos' home.

Makedonikos decided to make tickets for the game unavailable to Aris supporters. Nonetheless, about 500 Aris fans went to Kozani, and were able to secure tickets. They cheered the club on, as it won the second game, by a score of 89–78, and Aris advanced to the Greek Cup final game, as it had outscored Makedonikos by 10 points over the two games, and thus won the tie breaker. Aris had to play the EuroLeague powerhouse Panathinaikos in the final.

The Cup final took place at Irakleio, on Crete, and the Hellenic Basketball Federation decided not to allow any tickets to the game to be sold to the fans of the two teams, but instead only to the local people of the Irakleio area. However, about 150 Aris fans were able to manage their way into the arena, to help support the club. The Cup final was a tough and hard-fought game. Aris played well, but lost to Panathinaikos, by a 72–68 margin. The Aris players complained during the game (fairly in all of the cases), about the refereeing.

That same season Aris participated in a ULEB competition for the first time, as it was a part of the ULEB Cup (now called EuroCup) that year. The club's goal was of course to win the ULEB Cup, so that the team would secure a berth in the EuroLeague competition the following season. Aris proceeded to the Top-16 round of the ULEB Cup, where it was matched up against Lietuvos Rytas of the Baltic League (Lietuvos Rytas would be the team that would eventually go on to win the ULEB Cup championship) in a two-game series.

Aris split the two games with Lietuvos rytas, but lost the series on the points aggregate differential of −2 points.  That same season, Aris was also eliminated from the Greek League without taking home the national championship. The club was eliminated in a fashion that, was at the time, the worst possible scenario for both the team's players and fans, as Aris lost in the playoffs once again to AEK Athens. But what made the loss even more painful, was that AEK managed to secure the clinching series victory at Aris' home arena, the Alexandreio Melathron.

2005–06 season
Aris finished the regular season of the Greek Basket League in 4th place, with a 15–11 win–loss record.  Aris lost to Panathinikos during the play-off semifinals, and had to face Maroussi in a best-of-five series, for third place.  With the series tied at 2–2, Aris went on to beat Maroussi, 59–63, in a dramatic game 5 in Athens. This earned Aris a return to the EuroLeague, after a 14-year absence, to the delight of its fans.

Although Aris was eliminated from the Greek Cup, they managed to reach the ULEB Cup (now called EuroCup) final game, which was held at the Spiroudome in Charleroi, Belgium. Aris proceeded from the group phase to the Top 16 stage, where the team eliminated fellow Greek club Panionios, in a two-game series. Aris won the first game in the series, by a score of 72–70, in Athens. In the second game at Alexandreio, Aris defeated Panionios, 112–105, in double overtime. Aris then eliminated the French Pro A League club ASVEL, with two victories, by scores of 67–60 and 77–67.

In the semifinals, Aris then faced Hemofarm, in a repeat of the semifinal of the 2003 Champion's Cup. Aris lost by a score of 74–71, in the game in Serbia, and needed a late victory in the game in Thessaloniki to make it to the final against Dynamo Moscow. On 11 April, Dynamo Moscow defeated Aris, 73–60, in the final, and won the ULEB Cup (EuroCup) championship.

2006–07 season

Aris performed outstandingly during the 2006–07 season of the Greek Basket League, finishing the regular season in second place, with a 21–5 win–loss record. Although this gave Aris a home court-advantage in the Best-of-five playoff semifinal against Olympiacos, Aris lost game five by a score of 75–83, and had to face Panionios in the 3rd place series, and a chance at a renewed EuroLeague berth. Aris defeated Panionios 73–60 in game five, securing their second consecutive EuroLeague appearance.

The 2006–07 season also marked the return of Aris to the EuroLeague, for the first time since the 1991–92 season, a 15-year absence. Aris was placed in Group C, along with CSKA Moscow, FC Barcelona, Benetton Treviso, Pau Orthez, Eldo Napoli, Fenerbahçe, and Žalgiris Kaunas. With a 6–8 win–loss record, Aris managed to clinch 5th place in the group, and thus qualify to the Top 16. Aris was then placed in Group D, alongside Unicaja Málaga, Dynamo Moscow, and Benetton Treviso.  Aris was eliminated from the competition, only managing a 1–5 win–loss record in the Top 16, and finishing at the bottom of the group.

2007–14
During the following years of this era, Aris continued to have only moderate success. Their best season was in 2010–11, when they finished in fourth place in the Greek League. During these years, the club continued to promote young talented players, such as Kostas Papanikolaou, Kostas Sloukas, Sasha Vezenkov, and others.

2015–present
In 2015, a new era started for the club, as Nikolaos Laskaris became the club's new major shareholder. With head coach Dimitris Priftis, and new players in the team, Aris B.C. once again began aspiring to be competitive, with the goal to either return to the EuroLeague, or have success in the FIBA Champions League, during the upcoming years.

Roster

Depth chart

Retired numbers

Honours

Domestic competitions
 Greek League
 Winners (10): 1929–30, 1978–79, 1982–83, 1984–85, 1985–86, 1986–87, 1987–88, 1988–89, 1989–90, 1990–91
 Runners-up (8): 1928–29, 1957–58, 1958–59, 1964–65, 1965–66, 1975–76, 1981–82, 1983–84
 Greek Cup
 Winners (8): 1984–85, 1986–87, 1987–88, 1988–89, 1989–90, 1991–92, 1997–98, 2003–04
 Runners-up (6): 1983–84, 1992–93, 2002–03, 2013–14, 2016–17
 Greek Super Cup
 Winners (1): 1986

European competitions
 EuroLeague
 Semifinalist / Final Four (3): 1988, 1989, 1990
 FIBA Saporta Cup 
 Winners (1): 1992–93
 Semifinalist (2): 1993–94, 1998–99
 EuroCup Basketball 
 Runners-up (1): 2005–06
 FIBA Korać Cup 
 Winners (1): 1996–97
 Semifinalist (1): 1984–85
 FIBA EuroCup Challenge
 Winners (1): 2002–03

Regional
 Thessaloniki Championship
 Winners (6): 1925–26, 1926–27, 1927–28, 1928–29, 1929–30, 1957–58

Other
 Sofia, Bulgaria Invitational Game
 Winners (1): 2007
 Pescara, Italy Invitational Game
 Winners (1): 2007

Individual honours

Basketball Hall of Fame
Nikos Galis
FIBA Hall of Fame
Nikos Galis
José Ortiz
50 Greatest EuroLeague Contributors
Nikos Galis
Panagiotis Giannakis
Dušan Ivković
Mr. Europa 
Nikos Galis (1987)
Euroscar Award 
Nikos Galis (1987)
EuroLeague Top Scorer
 Nikos Galis (1991–92)

Greek League Top Scorer
Charis Papageorgiou (1975–76, 1978–79)
Nikos Galis (1980–81, 1981–82, 1982–83, 1983–84, 1984–85, 1985–86, 1986–87, 1987–88, 1988–89, 1989–90, 1990–91)
Nestoras Kommatos (2003–04)
Keydren Clark (2008–09)
Sasha Vezenkov (2014–15)
Greek League Best Young Player
Dimitrios Tsaldaris (2005–06)
Kostas Papanikolaou (2008–09)
Kostas Sloukas (2010–11)
Sasha Vezenkov (2012–13, 2013–14, 2014–15)

Greek League MVP
Nikos Galis (1987–88, 1988–89, 1989–90, 1990–91, 1991–92)
Sasha Vezenkov (2014–15)
Greek League Finals MVP
Nikos Galis (1986–87, 1987–88, 1988–89, 1989–90, 1990–91)
Greek League Top Rebounder
Roy Tarpley (1992–93)
Spencer Nelson (2008–09)
Greek League Assist Leader
 Panagiotis Giannakis (1988–89)
 Nikos Galis (1990–91, 1991–92)
Greek League Coach of the Year
 Dimitris Priftis (2015–16)
Greek Cup MVP
 Panagiotis Liadelis (1997–98)
 Nestoras Kommatos (2003–04)

Records and statistics

Greek League records

Sponsors and Manufacturers
Since 1980 Aris had a specific kit manufacturer and a kit sponsor. The following tables detail the shirt sponsors and kit suppliers of Aris by year:

Current Sponsorships
Great Shirt Sponsor: Wolf
Official Sport Clothing Manufacturer: Crossover

Crest evolution

Arena
In the club's early days, Aris played its home games at the Thessaloniki Forum. Since then, Aris' long-time home court is the Alexandreio Melathron, with its main hall being named "Nick Galis Hall", in honour of the former Aris player Nikos Galis. The venue was completed in 1966, and it was renovated for the 2004 Summer Olympics. The arena has a seating capacity of 5,138 people.

Nick Galis Cup

Since 2014, Aris B.C. organizes every year, in the start of the season, a friendly mini-tournament in honour of Nikos Galis.

Top performances in European & Worldwide competitions

The road to the three European Cup victories

1992–93 FIBA European Cup

1996–97 FIBA Korać Cup

2002–03 FIBA Europe Champions Cup

The road to the Great European Journeys

1987–88 FIBA European Champions Cup

1988–89 FIBA European Champions Cup

1989–90 FIBA European Champions Cup

2005–06 ULEB Cup

Season-by-season
Scroll down to see more.

Notable players

Greece
 Lazaros Agadakos
 Vangelis Alexandris
 Dinos Angelidis
 Antonis Asimakopoulos
 Ioannis Athinaiou
 Nikos Barlos
 Lefteris Bochoridis
 Kostas Charalampidis
 Kostas Charissis
 Nikos Chatzivrettas
 Linos Chrysikopoulos
 Dimos Dikoudis
 Georgios Doxakis
 Nikos Filippou
 Ioannis Gagaloudis
 Nasos Galakteros
- Nikos Galis
 Georgios Gasparis
 Panagiotis Giannakis
 Giannis Giannoulis
 Nikos Gkikas
 Savvas Iliadis
 Giannis Ioannidis
 Memos Ioannou
 Michalis Kakiouzis
 Georgios Kalaitzis
 Manthos Katsoulis
 Vassilis Kavvadas
 Dimitris Kokolakis
 Nestoras Kommatos
 Alexis Kyritsis
 Giannoulis Larentzakis
 Panagiotis Liadelis
 Vassilis Lipiridis
 Sotiris Manolopoulos
 Marios Matalon
 Faidon Matthaiou
 Dinos Mitoglou
 Spyros Mourtos
 Christos Myriounis
 Makis Nikolaidis
 Charis Papageorgiou
 Kostas Papanikolaou
 Michalis Pelekanos
 Stelios Poulianitis
 Michalis Romanidis
 Zisis Sarikopoulos
 Sofoklis Schortsanitis
 Georgios Sigalas
 Ioannis Sioutis
 Gaios Skordilis
 Kostas Sloukas
 Tzanis Stavrakopoulos
 Vassilis Symtsak
 Christos Tapoutos
 Michalis Tsairelis
 Dimitris Tsaldaris
 Dimitris Verginis
 Nikos Vetoulas
 Vangelis Vourtzoumis
 Vassilis Xanthopoulos

USA
 Mahmoud Abdul-Rauf
 J.J. Anderson
 Joe Arlauckas
 Toby Bailey
 Corey Belser
 Walter Berry
 David Booth
 Anthony Bowie
 Torraye Braggs
 Corey Brewer
 Bobby Brown
 Eric Buckner
- Terrel Castle
 Terry Catledge
 Mario Chalmers
- Kee Kee Clark
 DeJuan Collins
 Anthony Cowan Jr.
 Will Cummings
 Rodney Dent
 Juan Dixon
- Bryce Douvier
- Bryant Dunston
 Harold Ellis
 A. J. English
 Desmon Farmer
- Kevin Fletcher
 James Forrest
 Anthony Frederick
 Kevin Freeman
 Anthony Goldwire
 Gary Grant
- Josh Grant
 Jamelle Hagins
 Sean Higgins
 Jermaine Jackson
 Dominic James
 Michael Jenkins
 Edgar Jones
 Mike Jones
 Shakur Juiston
 James Kelly
- Sergio Kerusch
 Chris King
 Frankie King
 Sean Marshall
- Jeremiah Massey
 Jerel McNeal
 Aaron Miles
 Isaiah Morris
 Sam Muldrow
- Spencer Nelson
 Smush Parker
 Pierre Pierce
 Adrian Oliver
 Khalid Reeves
 Jeremy Richardson
 Darnell Robinson
 Alex Scales
 Tom Scheffler
 Melvin Scott
 Brad Sellers
 Charles Shackleford
 Will Solomon
- Ryan Stack
 Ed Stokes
 Roy Tarpley
 Reyshawn Terry
 Reggie Theus
 John Thomas
 P. J. Tucker
 Sam Vincent
 Brett Vroman
 Jermaine Walker
 Matt Walsh
- Darius Washington Jr.
 Dominic Waters
 Randy White
 Okaro White
 Tony White
- Mike Wilkinson
 Xeyrius Williams
 Bracey Wright

Rest of the Americas

 José Ortiz (Piculín)
 Olivier Hanlan
 Greg Wiltjer

Europe

 Dimitar Angelov
 Edin Bavčić
 Muhamed Pašalić
- Vladimir Boisa
 Viktor Sanikidze
 Jake Cohen
 Anatoly Kashirov
 Fedor Likholitov
 Mikhail Mikhailov
 Nikolay Padius
--Michail Misounov
 Alan Gregov
 Zdravko Radulović
 Ante Grgurević
 Stojko Vranković
- Franko Nakić
 Martin Müürsepp
 Hanno Möttölä
 Antti Nikkilä
 Mario Boni
 Geert Hammink
 Torgeir Bryn
 Alexander Kühl
 Žarko Paspalj
 Ivan Paunić
- Miroslav Pecarski
- Vladimir Petrović-Stergiou
- Miroslav Raičević
- Srđan Jovanović
 Dejan Borovnjak
 Dragan Labović
- Anton Gavel
 Vladimir Dragičević
 Blagota Sekulić
 Simonas Serapinas
- Tiit Sokk
 Matej Krušič
- Slobodan Subotić
-- Sasha Vezenkov
 Andrew Betts
 Steve Bucknall
 Yorick Williams

Greece national team players
These players have played for both Aris and the senior Greece men's national basketball team (in any game, official or friendly, and in any tournament, FIBA sanctioned, or non-FIBA sanctioned): 

Vangelis Alexandris
Dinos Angelidis
Antonis Asimakopoulos
Ioannis Athinaiou
Nikos Barlos
Lefteris Bochoridis
Georgios Bogris
Kostas Charissis
Kostas Charalampidis
Dimitris Charitopoulos
Nikos Chatzivrettas
Linos Chrysikopoulos
Dimos Dikoudis
Nikos Filippou
Nasos Galakteros
Nikos Galis
Nikos Gkikas
Georgios Gasparis
Panagiotis Giannakis
Giannis Giannoulis
Michalis Giannouzakos
Savvas Iliadis
Giannis Ioannidis
Memos Ioannou
Vlado Janković
Michalis Kakiouzis
Georgios Kalaitzis
Dimitris Karadolamis
Manthos Katsoulis
Vassilis Kavvadas
Dimitris Kokolakis
Nestoras Kommatos
Fanis Koumpouras
Alexis Kyritsis
Giannoulis Larentzakis
Panagiotis Liadelis
Vassilis Lipiridis
Faidon Matthaiou
Dinos Mitoglou
Christos Myriounis
Charis Papageorgiou
Kostas Papanikolaou
Nikos Papanikolopoulos
Michalis Pelekanos
Michalis Romanidis
Sofoklis Schortsanitis
Georgios Sigalas
Ioannis Sioutis
Gaios Skordilis
Kostas Sloukas
Tzanis Stavrakopoulos
Christos Tapoutos
Michalis Tsairelis
Dimitris Tsaldaris
Panagiotis Vasilopoulos
Nikos Vetoulas
Vangelis Vourtzoumis
Vassilis Xanthopoulos
Zisis Sarikopoulos

Aris head coaches by season

Management

Ownership & Current Board

Medical team

See also
Aris Thessaloniki
Thessaloniki Forum

References

External links

Official Basketball Website 
ΑΡΗΣ: Η ομάδα που έβαλε το μπάσκετ στα σπίτια των Ελλήνων
Emperor Fans' Portal 
Super3 Official Website 
Official Website Of Members "Club Friends of Aris" 
Galanis Sports Data
Press
All about Aris 
Media
Official YouTube channel

 
Basketball teams in Greece
Basketball teams established in 1922
1922 establishments in Greece